The Ministry of Energy of Chile is an entity created during the late part of the first presidency of Michelle Bachelet (2006−2010) after the releasing of the N°20.402 Decrete of Law on 1 February 2010.

Since that date, the current minister was separated from the Ministry of Mining. Its current minister is Diego Pardow Lorenzo.

List of representatives

References

External Link
 

Government ministries of Chile